Alphacrambus razowskii is a moth of the family Crambidae in the genus Alphacrambus. It was described by Stanisław Błeszyński in 1961 and is known from South Africa.

References

Endemic moths of South Africa
Moths described in 1961
Crambini
Moths of Africa